Kozani is one of the regional units of Greece. It is part of the region of Western Macedonia, in the geographic region of Macedonia. Its capital is  the city of Kozani.

Geography

Kozani borders the regional units of Kastoria to the west and northwest, Florina to the north, Pella to the northeast, Imathia and Pieria to the east, Larissa (part of Thessaly) to the southeast, and Grevena to the south.

The main mountain ranges are Askio in the northwest, Voio in the west, Vermio in the northeast and the Pierian Mountains in the southeast. The river Aliakmon flows through the southern part, and through the large reservoir Lake Polyfytos.   Lignite is mined in the north, around Ptolemaida.

Climate
Its climate ranges from continental to mountainous. Kozani has warm to hot summers and cool winters, cooler than Thessaloniki, the mountainous, the western and the eastern portions receive cold winters and features snow. Its sunshine days are days shorter than the south and by the coastline, it is rainier than the south. Temperatures range from  during the summer months.

Administration

The regional unit Kozani is subdivided into 5 municipalities. These are (number as in the map in the infobox):
 Eordaia (2)
 Kozani (1)
 Servia (4)
 Velventos (5)
 Voio (3)

Prefecture

Kozani was created as a prefecture in 1915. As a part of the 2011 Kallikratis government reform, the regional unit Kozani was created out of the former prefecture Kozani. The prefecture had the same territory as the present regional unit. At the same time, the municipalities were reorganised. The municipality Servia-Velventos was split into the municipalities Servia and Velventos in 2019.

Provinces
Kozani had three provinces: 
 Kozani Province - Kozani
 Eordea Province - Ptolemaida
 Voio Province - Siatista

History

Early years
The area was part of several kingdoms of Upper Macedonia, including the ancient Eordaia and Elimiotis, and it was later part of the kingdom of Macedonia. After the Third Macedonian War it was ruled by the Roman Empire. It later became a part of the Byzantine Empire after the breakup into the West and the East. In the early 14th to the 15th century, it was ruled by the Ottoman Empire and lasted until the Balkan Wars of 1913.  The Kozani Prefecture was created in 1915 and also included the present Florina, Grevena and the Kastoria regional units.

Modern times
Refugees from Asia Minor and Pontus during the Greco-Turkish War of 1919 to 1922 brought refugees to the area including Kozani and villages and towns that removed the Turkish population to the country which later became only known as Turkey.  The economy boomed and was disrupted later on.  After World War II and the Greek Civil War, most of the buildings were repaired.  Kozani opened its airport and later its hospital.

Economy

Kozani has been a prosperous area in the course of its history. Its merchants are known to have dominated the commerce of the Balkan peninsula, expanding their trade activities to the north and along the Danube. Nowadays, Kozani is still among the most prosperous areas of the Greek province, but for a different reason, its rich mining industry. Kozani produces lignite, which is the main source of the electric power produced in Greece, nitrous salts which are processed into fertilizers, and chromium. There was also an asbestos mine that remained operational until the mid-1990s, which has now ceased its operation. In the regional unit of Kozani there is also the artificial lake and hydroelectric dam of Polyfytos, which further contributes to the electricity production of Greece. The region's vast industrial advancement in a short period of time has raised environmentalist concerns.

Transport

 National Roads
 Greek National Road 3, SE, Cen., N
 Greek National Road 15, SW, W
 Greek National Road 20, SW, W, Cen.
 Via Egnatia
 Air transport:
 Kozani National Airport "Filippos", 4 km from Kozani (flights to Kastoria, Athens).
 Rail transport:
 Kozani-Amyntaio railway line

See also
 List of settlements in the Kozani regional unit

References

External links

 
Prefectures of Greece
1915 establishments in Greece
Regional units of Western Macedonia